The PRO-AM Singapore Basketball League (PRO-AM SBL) was the preeminent men's pro–am basketball league in Singapore.

Twelve clubs participated in the league's inaugural season in 2014, which culminated with Adroit Sports Association emerging as the first PRO-AM SBL champions on 29 June 2014 after they beat the LJE Bobcats with an 81–79 scoreline.

History
The idea of a Pro-Am basketball league was first sparked off by Zoran Vasiljev, the founder and CEO of Affinitiv Capital LLP, a Singapore-based equity firm. The Serbian-born Singaporean, a former cager who played college basketball in the U.S as well as professionally in Europe, envisioned a local basketball league which provided opportunities for personal growth and development of youth athletes while also reinforcing positive influences, self-confidence, self-esteem and the ability to excel on and off the court.

The formation of a new Pro-Am league was announced on 22 December 2013. In order to fulfill this, Sportfolio Group LLP was incorporated by Vasiljev for the purpose of managing the new league. 

The league tipped off officially on 12 January 2013, kick-starting a five-month competition that saw 132 games played between the 12 founding teams across multiple venues around Singapore. The inaugural season was seen by over 24,000 fans and featured 285 players from 26 countries, and was covered by most of the local media (Channel News Asia, The Straits Times, The New Paper, Today, 93.8 Live Radio and Liahne Zabao).

Teams
The Pro-Am SBL originated with 12 teams in 2013 with the initial founding teams spread across Singapore. The teams included players from all communities, including expats and import guest players.

The inaugural season was a great success, and besides receiving recognition by the FIBA and the regional basketball fraternity, the league has clearly differentiated from any other recreational or minor-league basketball organization in Singapore.

See also
 Sport in Singapore
 National Basketball League

References

2014 establishments in Singapore
Basketball competitions in Singapore
Basketball leagues in Asia
Sports leagues established in 2014
Basketball
Professional sports leagues in Singapore